Geoffrey Littlejohn Ogilvy (25 January 1906 – 20 January 1962) played first-class cricket for Somerset in two matches in the 1936 season. He was born at Lewisham in London and died at Dreemskerry, Maughold, Isle of Man.

Educated at St Bees School, Ogilvy was a right-handed middle-order batsman. He played in several Minor Counties matches for Dorset in 1931 and 1932. His two first-class matches for Somerset were both in June 1936. Against Sussex he batted at No 4 and scored 29 and 3. But later in the month he was at No 10 in the game against Cambridge University, scoring 12 in what was his last first-class innings.

References

1906 births
1962 deaths
English cricketers
Dorset cricketers
Somerset cricketers
People educated at St Bees School